Alfred William Jewett (15 November 1899 – 13 July 1980) was an English footballer who made 38 appearances in the Football League playing for Lincoln City and Wigan Borough as a centre half. He was on the books of Southampton and Arsenal, without representing either club in the league, and also played non-league football for Bitterne United, Thornycrofts, and Bournemouth & Boscombe Athletic.

References

1899 births
1980 deaths
Footballers from Southampton
English footballers
Association football defenders
Southampton F.C. players
Arsenal F.C. players
Lincoln City F.C. players
Wigan Borough F.C. players
AFC Bournemouth players
English Football League players